Zeng is a Chinese family name. In Cantonese, it is Tsang; In Wade-Giles, such as those in Taiwan, Tseng or Tzeng; in Malaysia and Singapore, Chen or Cheng; in the Philippines, Chan; in Indonesia, Tjan; in Vietnam, Tăng. The surname Zeng is the 32nd most common surname in Mainland China as of 2019. It is the 16th most common surname in Taiwan. It meant "high" or "add" in ancient Chinese.
Zeng is also a German family name with another origin.

Zeng was listed 385th on the Hundred Family Surnames.

Origin
The surname originates from  an ancient state located in present-day Cangshan County (now Lanling County) in Shandong province, which was granted to Qu Lie, son of the emperor Shao Kang in the Xia dynasty. The state was annexed by Ju (located mainly in present-day Shandong province) in 567 BC. The
crown prince of the state, Wu, fled to Lu. He later dropped the radical in the character and adopted 曾 as his surname.

Generation Character
The Generation Character usually refers to the middle Character of the Chinese Name of a Zeng, and is used to determine the generation and clan a Zeng belongs to.

Generation Character Order
The Generation Character for Zeng from the 63rd Generation to the 97th Generation are as follows:

63rd to 67th Generation (Given in Year 1400)
Hong, Wen, Zhen, Shang and Yan

68th to 77th Generation (Set in Year 1628)
Xing, Yu, Chuan, Ji, Guang, Zhao, Xian, Qing, Fan and Xiang

78th to 87th Generation (Set in Year 1863)
Ling, De, Wei, Chui, You, Qin, Shao, Nian, Xian and Yang

88th to 97th Generation (Set in Year 1870)
Jian, Dao, Dun, An, Ding, Mao, Xiu, Zhao, Yi, Zhang, Yi, Wen, Huan, Jing, Rui, Yong, Xi, Shi, Xu, Chang

Notable people
 Zengzi - Philosopher and disciple of Confucius.
 Zeng Shan - father of Zeng Qinghong, former Chinese politician
 Zeng Qinghong, former politburo standing committee member, Vice President
 Alice Tzeng – film actress
 Bowie Tsang – compere, singer
 Derek Tsang – flim actor
 Donald Tsang – former chief executive of Hong Kong
 Edward Tsang – computer scientist
 Eric Tsang – film actor, director
 Jasper Tsang – former President of the Legislative Council of Hong Kong
 Yani Tseng – professional golfer
 Tsang Tsou Choi – The Kowloon Emperor (Hong Kong graffiti artist)
 Tsang Yam Pui – former commissioner of the Hong Kong Police
 Tseng Chang – Chinese American actor
 Tseng Chung-ming, Deputy Minister of Health and Welfare of the Republic of China (2013–2015)
 Tseng Jen-Ho, Taiwanese baseball player
 Tseng Jing-ling, Minister of Veterans Affairs Commission of the Republic of China (2009–2013)
 Tseng Ming-chung, Chairperson of the Financial Supervisory Commission of the Republic of China (2013–2016)
 Tseng Shu-cheng, Deputy Mayor of Tainan (2015–2016)
 Tseng Yung-chuan, Vice President of the Legislative Yuan (2008–2012)
 Tseng Yung-fu, Minister of Justice of the Republic of China (2010–2013)
 Zeng Cheng, China PR national football team goalkeeper
 Zeng Chengwei
 Zeng Fanren
 Zeng Fanzhi
 Zeng Gong
 Zeng Guofan
 Zeng Jinlian
 Zeng Jing
 Zeng Junchen, "King of Opium"
 Zeng Liansong
 Ovid Tzeng, Minister of Council of Cultural Affairs of the Republic of China (2011–2012)
 Zeng Peiyan
 Zeng Qiliang, Chinese breaststroke swimmer
 Zeng Xian, Ming dynasty general
 Zeng Xianyi
 Zeng Xueming (Tăng Tuyết Minh) - Undisclosed wife of Ho Chi Minh
 Zeng Yanfen Member of SNH48
 Zeng Yi (painter) Oil painter
 Zeng Meihuizi - film actress
 Zeng Yike, Chinese singer

See also
Chinese name
Tomb of Marquis Yi of Zeng

References

External links
 http://www.chineseetymology.org/CharacterASP/CharacterEtymology.aspx?characterInput=%E6%9B%BE Etymology of 曾

Chinese-language surnames
Individual Chinese surnames